Leo is an unincorporated community in Jackson Township, Jackson County, Ohio, United States.

The town is best known as the location of the Leo Petroglyph.

References 

Unincorporated communities in Jackson County, Ohio